Austrojet was an Austrian charter airline operated by BFS (Business Flight Salzburg Bedarfsflug GesmbH). The airline originally commenced scheduled services to boost the economy between western Austria and Bosnia and Herzegowina.

Destinations 
Since April 2008, Austrojet operated the Salzburg – Banja Luka route three times a week, with plans to fly to Tivat, Montenegro and Stuttgart, Germany. By January 2009, all references to scheduled service no longer appear on the Austrojet website.

Fleet 

The Austrojet fleet consisted of the following aircraft:

1 Bombardier DHC 8-100 (leased to Olympic Air)
1 Citation 501
2 Citation 550

References

External links

 Austrojet

Defunct airlines of Austria
Airlines established in 2006
Airlines disestablished in 2009
2009 disestablishments in Austria
Austrian companies established in 2006